Jessica MacDonald (born July 12, 1985; née Bondy) is a wrestler from Canada. She began wrestling for Brock University in St. Catharines, Ontario in 2003. Jessica is a three-time world medalist, and in 2012 earned the title of World Champion while competing in the 51 kg weight class of female wrestling.

In March 2018, MacDonald was named to Canada's 2018 Commonwealth Games team. MacDonald was also the winner of the 2019 Olympic Canadian Wrestling Trials in the 50kg weight class.

References

External links
 bio on fila-wrestling.com

Living people
Brock Badgers wrestlers
Canadian female sport wrestlers
Wrestlers at the 2010 Commonwealth Games
Commonwealth Games bronze medallists for Canada
Sportspeople from Windsor, Ontario
1985 births
World Wrestling Championships medalists
Commonwealth Games medallists in wrestling
Wrestlers at the 2018 Commonwealth Games
20th-century Canadian women
21st-century Canadian women
Medallists at the 2018 Commonwealth Games